Dongzhou District, is one of the four districts under the administration of Fushun City, in Liaoning Province, China.

Administrative divisions
There are ten subdistricts and two townships in the district.

Subdistricts:

 Dalian Subdistrict
 Dongzhou Subdistrict – Seat of the Dongzhou District People's Government
 Laohutai Subdistrict
 Liushan Subdistrict
 Longfeng Subdistrict
 Nanhuayuan Subdistrict
 Pingshan Subdistrict
 Wanxin Subdistrict
 Xintun Subdistrict
 Zhangdian Subdistrict

Townships:

 Nianpan Township
 Qianjin Township

See also
 Pingdingshan (village)

References

External links

Fushun
County-level divisions of Liaoning
Districts of China